Sriram Krishnan is an Indian-American investor and partner at the venture capital firm Andreessen Horowitz. His investments include Atlys, and he serves on the boards of companies including Hopin. He previously led product teams at Microsoft, Twitter, Yahoo!, Facebook, and Snap. He rose to additional prominence in 2021 for leading the Good Time Show Clubhouse (now YouTube) chat show with his wife that has featured Elon Musk, Mark Zuckerberg, and Virgil Abloh, as well as Steve Balmer calling from his hot tub. In early 2022, Variety reported that WME was representing the "tech power couple" of Krishnan and spouse Aarthi Ramamurthy in film and television projects, as well as additional podcasting work. 

In 2022, Krishnan announced that he was working with Elon Musk on the rebuilding of Twitter following Musk's acquisition of the company. A 2022 Fortune report published rumors that Krishnan would be selected as the next CEO of Twitter.

Early life and education 
Krishan was born in Chennai, India, in a middle-income Tamil family. His life changed in the late 1990s when he managed to persuade his father to buy him a computer. As he still did not have internet access, Krishan would buy coding books and practice coding basics every night. This prompted him to pursue a career in information technology.

He earned his Bachelor's in Information Technology from SRM Engineering College, Anna University (2001-2005).

Career

Early career 
In 2007, he began working at Microsoft where he served as a program manager for Visual Studio. At Facebook, Krishnan built the Facebook Audience Network, a competitive platform to Google’s ad technologies. At Snap, he built the company’s ad tech platform shortly before its IPO. He then joined Twitter, where he served as senior director of product and contributed to the core user experience, driving a 20% annual user growth rate and launching a redesigned home page and events experience.

Good Time Show 
In early 2021, Krishnan and his wife, Aarthi Ramamurthy, launched a Clubhouse talk show that “focuses on organic conversations on anything from startups to venture capitalism and cryptocurrencies." An early appearance by Elon Musk on the Good Time Show was described as the first show that “broke Clubhouse” by rapidly exceeding the limit of 5,000 simultaneous users. The desire to interact with a larger community led to a variety of later innovations to allow streaming and replaying of Clubhouse chats. On that episode, Elon Musk grilled Robinhood CEO Vlad Tenev regarding the GameStop trading controversy. As of December 2021, the show had over 187,000 subscribers, plus 735,000 subscribers between Krishnan and Ramamurthy's personal Clubhouse accounts.  

During Krishnan’s interview with Facebook CEO Mark Zuckerberg, Zuckerberg described augmented and virtual reality as the future of work, alluding to the then-unannounced Meta concept. Additional guests have included Tony Hawk, Diane von Fürstenberg, Sonam Kapoor Ahuja, Kanye West, and MrBeast; other topics have included emerging issues such as ConstitutionDAO.

In 2022, the Good Time Show moved to YouTube.

Andreessen Horowitz 
Krishnan was appointed a general partner of American venture capital firm Andreessen Horowitz (“a16z”) in February 2021. He is anticipated to serve consumer and social markets, however he has also theorized on the impact of “deep tech” on society. His investments through a16z include Atlys.

Twitter 
In 2022, various news media reported that Krishnan was assisting Elon Musk in the revamp of Twitter following Musk's takeover of the company. Additional reports named Krishnan as the leading candidate for the role of CEO of the newly private company.

Personal life 
Krishnan is married to Aarthi Ramamurthy, co-host of the Good Time Show and a serial entrepreneur. They met in college in 2003 through a Yahoo! chat room related to a coding project and began dating in 2006. They live in San Francisco.

References

External links 

 The Good Time Show (YouTube)
 Official website of The Good Time Show 

Living people
Silicon Valley people
Andreessen Horowitz
American venture capitalists
People from Chennai
Year of birth missing (living people)